The 2017 Patriot League women's basketball tournament was held March 4, 6, 10, and 11 at campus sites of the higher seed, except that both semi-final games will be played at the same site of the highest seed. This means that Bucknell vs. American and Army vs. Navy will both be played in Lewisburg, Pennsylvania, at Sojka Pavilion on Friday, March 10, 2017, at 5:00pm and 7:30pm respectively. The winner of the tournament will  earn an automatic trip to the NCAA women's tournament.

Seeds
Teams are seeded by conference record, with ties broken in the following order:
 Head-to-head record between the teams involved in the tie
 Record against the highest-seeded team not involved in the tie, going down through the seedings as necessary
 Higher RPI entering the tournament, as published by College Basketball News

Schedule

Bracket

External links
 2017 Patriot League Women's Basketball Championship

Tournament
Patriot League women's basketball tournament